Paris La Défense Arena (originally known as the U Arena) is a multi-use domed stadium in Nanterre, a western suburb of Paris. Opened in October 2017, it was developed by the rugby union club Racing 92, and replaced Stade Olympique Yves-du-Manoir as their home field. It is one of the two multi-use domed stadiums to be built in Europe, along with Telenor Arena and is Europe's largest indoor arena. Its naming rights are held by Paris La Défense, the management company of the nearby La Défense business district.

The venue offers three separate configurations. In its rugby configuration, it has a nominal seating capacity of 30,681. For concerts, it is able to seat 40,000. Finally, a movable stand allows it to also be used for a variety of indoor sports, at various capacities, with a capacity of as low as 5,000 being possible. The venue also includes  of office space, 300 student rooms, shops, including a club shop, a brewery and a gourmet restaurant.

It is scheduled to host swimming at the 2024 Summer Olympics. Due to IOC sponsorship regulations, the venue will be referred to as Arena 92.

History

The stadium was originally planned to open in 2014, but that date was delayed, due to local protests.

It eventually opened in October 2017, although Racing 92 did not play their first home game in the new stadium until they hosted Toulouse on 22 December 2017. The stadium's working name was changed from "Arena92" to "U Arena"; referencing the configuration of the main stands, and the structure's shape, when viewed from the air, in November 2016. The name was changed a second time to the current Paris La Défense Arena on 12 June 2018. This followed a 10-year naming rights agreement with Paris La Défense, the company that manages the nearby La Défense business district.

The venue was originally planned to have a retractable roof, but it was ultimately built with a fixed roof instead.

The Rolling Stones were the first band to ever perform a concert in the stadium, closing their Europe-only No Filter Tour, with three shows, on 19, 22, and 25 October 2017. The arena's first rugby union match, took place on 25 November 2017 between France and Japan. On 11 March 2018, the French professional basketball clubs Nanterre 92 and ASVEL Basket, played each other in a LNB Pro A 2017–18 season game. The game had an attendance of 15,220, which was the highest attendance of any game in the league's history. Since 2017 it has hosted the Paris Motocross.

Entertainment events

References

External links

 
Stadium information Le Monde  

2017 establishments in France
Venues of the 2024 Summer Olympics
Basketball venues in France
Covered stadiums
Olympic gymnastics venues
Racing 92
Music venues in France
Music venues in Paris
Music venues completed in 2017
Rugby union stadiums in France
Sports venues completed in 2017
Sports venues in Hauts-de-Seine
Sports venues in Paris
21st-century architecture in France